Rani Padmavati Devi was an Indian politician from Madhya Pradesh.
She represented Birendranagar Vidhan Sabha constituency of undivided Madhya Pradesh Legislative Assembly by winning General election of 1957.

References 

Women members of the Madhya Pradesh Legislative Assembly
Madhya Pradesh MLAs 1957–1962
Year of birth missing
Possibly living people
20th-century Indian women politicians
20th-century Indian politicians
Indian National Congress politicians from Madhya Pradesh